Melbourne Grammar School is an Australian independent Anglican day and boarding school. It comprises a co-educational preparatory school from Prep to Year 6 and a middle school and senior school for boys from Years 7 to 12. The three campuses are Grimwade House (Prep to Year 6) in Caulfield, Wadhurst (Years 7 and 8) and Senior School (Years 9 to 12), both in the suburb of South Yarra.

Founded on 7 April 1858 as the Melbourne Church of England Grammar School, the school currently caters for approximately 1,900 students from Prep to Year 12, including 120 boarders from Years 7 to 12.

Melbourne Grammar is affiliated with the Headmasters' and Headmistresses' Conference, the Association of Heads of Independent Schools of Australia (AHISA), the Independent Primary School Heads of Australia (IPSHA), the Australian Boarding Schools' Association (ABSA), the Association of Independent Schools of Victoria (AISV), and is a founding member of the historic Associated Public Schools of Victoria (APS).  The school is also a member of the G20 Schools Group, and officially a partner school with Waseda University and its affiliates in Japan.
Three of Australia's former prime ministers were educated at Melbourne Grammar School.

History 

The origins of Melbourne Grammar School (colloquially known as Grammar) can be traced back to 1849, with the establishment of an experimental grammar school at St Peter's Eastern Hill, East Melbourne. This school had been established by Melbourne's first Church of England bishop, Charles Perry, who founded the Diocese of Melbourne, and had been opened to meet the growing educational needs of the young colony. In 1853, Bishop Perry commenced planning for the diocesan experimental school to become permanent, although on a larger site and not under his direct management, and so he set up a committee of eminent men to consider the task. The school however did not thrive and was suspended at the end of 1854.

The first board of governors was elected in 1854 to take over from the committee, and it set about drawing up a constitution, finding a headmaster and a new site. Locations considered included Carlton, Prahran and St Kilda.

This is the inner South Yarra land now occupied by the Senior School and Wadhurst, next to the Royal Botanic Gardens and a short walk from the city centre. At the time it was considered relatively isolated and remote. The governors chose architects Charles Webb and Thomas Taylor, well known Melbourne contractors George Cornwell and Co. undertook the construction, and Bishop Perry laid the school's foundation stone on 30 July 1856.

The Melbourne Church of England Grammar School was finally opened on 7 April 1858 with 76 pupils, and with John E. Bromby as the first headmaster. Enrolments grew to 136 during the first year, with four students being the sons of Bromby, and about one quarter of them boarders.

The school's first 40 years proved to be a struggle, exacerbated in the 1890s by economic depression, financial concerns and changes of headmaster. Senior school enrolments fell from 272 in 1889 to 117 in 1894 prompting a group of former students to do something to save the school. They formed The Old Melburnians Society in 1895 "to be the means of bringing together many former schoolmates, reviving pleasant recollections, and at the same time benefiting the life of the School as it is today".

Two significant developments of the late 19th century were, firstly, the recognition that with a limited site, one storey buildings were not a wise use of space. A move began, continued now, of adding second stories or replacing buildings with two- or three-level structures. The second was the dedication of the Chapel of St Peter in 1893, the first school chapel in the colony of Victoria.

The beginning of the new century saw the school's future assured, with enrolments increasing and the Jubilee celebrated in 1908. Hundreds of former students enlisted in the Great War of 1914–1918, as they had in the South African War, and more than 200 did not return.

The 1920s were a relatively stable time for the school, experiencing high academic and sporting results. The 1930s however were an unsettling time. The Great Depression put pressure on members of the Grammar community, while administrative instability affected the whole school. Between 1935 and 1938 the school had three headmasters and two acting headmasters, and the outbreak of war the following year meant building plans were put on hold. Some 3,500 old boys enlisted in the services, and school buildings were commandeered by Australian and American forces with some students dispatched to the country and others doubled up in crowded quarters.

By the 1950s it became clear that the school was seriously lacking adequate space, with expansions, extensions and renovations mostly crammed into Bromby's original . The School subsequently embarked upon a building program which it was thought could take 30 years to complete, with the Senior School, Wadhurst and Grimwade campuses all receiving attention. The Centenary Building Campaign of 1958 began this expansion. Another solution to this problem since this time has been the steady acquisition of neighbouring properties.

In 1986 the governors decided on a staged restructure of the school. Until then, Wadhurst, established as a preparatory school in 1886 and Grimwade House, opened in 1918, had operated as two parallel feeder schools taking students through to Year 8. Grimwade's boarding house had closed in the mid-1970s, leading to debate on the best use of the newly available space. It was decided to introduce girls at primary levels at Grimwade House, and today Grimwade House caters for girls and boys up to Year 6 and Wadhurst for boys in Years 7 and 8.

The 1980s and 1990s were times of further growth, with the outdoor program expanded with three permanent campsites at Breakfast Creek near Licola, Woodend and Banksia Peninsula on the Gippsland Lakes. On 7 April 2008, as part of the celebrations of Melbourne Grammar's sesquicentenary, the school officially opened the multimillion-dollar Nigel Peck Centre for Learning and Leadership on the Domain Road boundary, an event which was attended by the Premier of Victoria, John Brumby, who is also an Old Melbournian.

Headmasters

Campuses
Melbourne Grammar School features seven campuses, three used for everyday schooling, one for sporting activities, and three for the school's outdoor education program:

 Grimwade House – Caulfield (Co-educational; prep to Year 6)
 Wadhurst – South Yarra (All boys; Years 7 to 8)
 Senior School – South Yarra (All boys; Years 9 to 12)
 Edwin Flack Park – Port Melbourne (Sporting complex)
 Camp Dowd – Gippsland Lakes (Camp; Year 8)
 Robert Knox Camp – Woodend (Camp; Years 5 to 7)
 L.G.Robertson Camp – Breakfast Creek, Licola (Camp; Years 9 to 12)

House system
In 1914, headmaster George Earnest Blanch introduced a formal house structure to further encourage interest in sport and promote physical development. Six houses were originally established. In addition to School House (the traditional English name given to the boarding house), names of the others houses commented the first two headmasters of Melbourne Grammar School (Bromby and Morris), two benefactors (Rusden and Witherby), and two brilliant all-rounder Old Melburnians (Jack and Hugh Ross). A room was assigned to each house where they could gather for meetings and socialise.

Initially, students were sorted into houses based on geographic distribution. Thus, boys from Toorak were put into Bromby House, while those from South Yarra and west of the Yarra River entered into Rusden House. Students from Malvern and Glen Iris joined Morris House, those from Brighton and other suburbs around Port Phillip Bay become members of Ross House, and Witherby House welcomed boys from Canterbury, Camberwell and other suburbs around the perimeter of Essendon.

The houses competed for the house championship and the prestige of being named "Cock House". They competed against each other in cricket, rowing, football, boxing (until 1950), running, shooting (until 1937), tennis and swimming.

Cock House Cup 

From the earliest days, competition between the houses was fierce. The prize in question was the Cock House Cup. A points system was put in place, and houses gathered points in a range of sports in their quest to be recognised as the reigning house.

First presented in 1916 by Sir Ronald Munro Ferguson, the sixth Governor General of Australia, the Cock House Cup was intended to stimulate interest in house games and to build the sense of the houses as individual entities.

School House was the most successful competitor during the competition, securing the title 26 times between 1914 and 1956. Following each victory, the cup was passed around, according to School House tradition, so that each member of the house could drink from it.

Hone reforms 
Upon becoming headmaster in 1951, Brian Hone initiated significant change in the purpose of the houses, shifting the focus from sporting prowess to pastoral care, house unity and the growth of the character of the students. The Cock House Cup was thought to be impeding this vision, so it ceased to be awarded.

School House, as the original boarding house, was perceived to be the backbone of life at the school. The 1920s, 1930s and 1940s were the era of the "Long Dorm", which saw justice meted out by the house captain and prefects. The North dormitory "terrorised the school", however, following the disruption to the school during the Second World War a shift in power occurred and the day boys "got out from under". Following the war, it was only the boarders who were still "terrorised", by this time it was by the East dormitory. It was Hone who gave the coup de grâce to the worst school house rituals that remained by the end of his first year.

Expansion of the house system 

The house system continued to evolve over the next six decades, with the establishment of a further six houses. Perry House was founded in 1940 and established as the school's second boarding house in 1952. Bruce House was established in the same year, as a new house for day students. The next two houses were Deakin House and Miller House, both established in 1961, with Hone House following in 1979. The most recent addition was Creese House, established in 2005.

Curriculum

Melbourne Grammar offers its Years 11 and 12 students the Victorian Certificate of Education (VCE), the main assessment program which ranks the students in the state.

In 2004, six Melbourne Grammar students achieved the maximum possible Equivalent National Tertiary Entrance Rank (ENTER) of 99.95; only 32 students in Victoria achieved this ENTER. In 2005, five Melbourne Grammar students achieved this same ENTER of 99.95.
In 2006, two Melbourne Grammar students achieved the maximum ENTER of 99.95, and three Melbourne Grammar students achieved an ENTER of 99.90. In 2007, three Melbourne Grammar students achieved the maximum ENTER of 99.95; again, only 32 students in Victoria achieved this ENTER. In 2008, five Melbourne Grammar students achieved the maximum ENTER of 99.95. This tradition was continued in 2009, when a record seven students achieved the maximum ENTER of 99.95. The school also recorded its best average score on record in 2009, with the median ENTER being 93.95. In 2010, three students achieved the highest possible ATAR score of 99.95 with median 91.5.   In 2011, Melbourne Grammar School's VCE students have achieved a commendable 89.8 median ATAR score, and another seven students achieved the maximum possible ATAR of 99.95.  In 2016, one student was awarded the maximum ATAR of 99.95, with five in 2018.

Co-curriculum

Debating
Melbourne Grammar has held inter-grammar school British Parliamentary Debating competitions with Scotch College and Sydney Grammar. Additionally, Melbourne Grammar enters students into the Debaters Association of Victoria's (DAV) Debating Competition in the Caufield region. In 2016, Melbourne Grammar won both the B Grade and D Grade competitions, and in 2017, won the D Grade competition for the second year in a row. In 2018, MGS won the A Grade championship.

Music
Melbourne Grammar's orchestra, the Melbourne Grammar School Symphony Orchestra (MGSSO), tours internationally in December every year. In 2005 the orchestra toured Malaysia and Singapore and in 2006 travelled to China, performing in Shanghai, Hong Kong and Guangzhou. In 2007 the orchestra toured Dubai, Zagreb, Ljubljana and Venice, while in December 2008 the orchestra once again returned to Malaysia for Martin Rutherford's final orchestra tour. In 2009, Mark Drummond took over the orchestra and in 2010 it toured Japan, performing in Osaka, Tokyo (at the Okuma Auditorium at Waseda University) and Gamagori. The MGSSO toured France and Belgium in 2012, then the United States in 2014, and Germany, Austria and the Czech Republic in 2016. In 2018, visited the UK, playing in London, Edinburgh and Glasgow. Pat Miller has been the conductor of the orchestra since October 2019. 

The orchestra is usually made up of around 100 students, the vast majority of whom attend the school. The MGSSO has accompanied international soloists such as Ronald Farren-Price, Leslie Howard and Neville Taweel, and has premiered works by Australian and British composers.

All of Melbourne Grammar's campuses have their own choirs, concert bands and string orchestras. The chapel choir is the oldest of any Victorian private school and consists of about 40 select members. It sings at the weekly Eucharists along with occasional concerts with the like of the Australian Brandenburg Orchestra.

Sport

Cordner-Eggleston Cup

The Cordner-Eggleston Cup is competed for each year by the 1st XVIII football teams of Melbourne Grammar School and Scotch College and has been run since 1858, making it the longest running school football fixture in the world. It commemorates the first recorded game of Australian Rules Football, which was played between the two schools on 7 August 1858, which ended in a 1–1 draw and is today commemorated by a statue depicting the game outside the Melbourne Cricket Ground.

Rose and Thistle Cup
The Rose and Thistle Cup traditionally is the match of the Melbourne Grammar Soccer 1st XI and the Scotch College 1st XI. Inaugurated in 2008, it represents the Rose of England (symbolising Melbourne Grammar School's origins) and the Thistle of Scotland (symboling the roots of Scotch College). The Cup has an annual theme of 'Two Traditions, One Spirit.'

Rowing
Melbourne Grammar has a proud rowing record, having claimed the Head of the River 28 times, the most recent occasion being in 2016. In 2009 the school had an exceptional 1st VIII who broke the Head of the River record. They also won the National Schoolboy 8+ over the Shore School in a record time of 5:49. The 2016 MGS 1st VIII, having won the Head of the River title, went on to compete at the Henley Royal Regatta in the UK, in the Princess Elizabeth Challenge Cup. The crew were inaugural winners of the Leander Club Challenge Cup.

Athletics
In recent years, Melbourne Grammar School has become a force in athletics, winning the APS premiership for the first time in 48 years in 2010. Over the past seven years, the school has won the Victorian track relay titles.

Soccer

Soccer is currently one of the most played sports at the school, with 12 teams being fielded in the APS Soccer Competition.

The Melbourne Grammar 1st XI Soccer team is yet to win an APS premiership. Following the hiring of VIS youth coach Ernie Merrick in 2000, the 1st XI began a steady improvement in subsequent years, leading to a third-placed finish in a tightly contested 2014 season and subsequently missed out on winning the premiership cup following a draw against the reigning premiers, Brighton Grammar. The strong performances of the 1st XI, as seen in 2014 and 2015, have partly been due to the guidance of Jesper Olsen, former Manchester United and Danish International winger.

Salvatore Sitch won the "MVP" award for the 1st XI in 2015. Lloyd Skinner won the same award in 2018, followed by Rowan Marshall in 2019.

In recent years, Melbourne Grammar School has produced A-League footballers including Stefan Nigro (Melbourne Victory), who received Man of The Match on debut against Brisbane Roar, and Yaren Sözer (Melbourne City FC) who played against EPL giants Manchester City. Furthermore, Old Melburnians have signed for overseas clubs in Spain.

20 goals is the most goals anyone has scored in a soccer APS match.

Basketball

Melbourne Grammar is an emerging force in the Victorian APS Basketball Competition, finishing 3rd in 2012 and 2014. Recent noteworthy players include Dane Pineau (recruited by St Marys College US), 2012 Captain and also Captain of the Australian under-19s national team, Daniel Fisher, who went on to attend American University on a scholarship and Victorian State and BigV men's players Jakob Cornelissen (recruited by University of Hawaii US) and Andrew Panyiotou.

Volleyball
Melbourne Grammar School's highest placing in the APS Volleyball Competition is 1st in 2016 and has forged a rich heritage of boys going on to play at State levels. Most recently led by 6'2 Utility Hitter/Setter Sebastian Herbst who currently plays collegiate volleyball at Cumberland University. He is the first Melbourne Grammar Student to attend university in the United States of America on a volleyball scholarship.

Snowsports 
Melbourne Grammar School has won 18 out of the last 19 Victorian APS Snowsports Cups.

Hockey 
The varyingly successful MGS Hockey team has seen APS Hockey Competition victory over multiple years, most recently in 2022. Boys who play in a Premiership-winning team are awarded with a ceremonial wooden hockey stick to commemorate their efforts.

Cricket 
Melbourne Grammar School competed in an annual cricket competition with Sydney Grammar from 1876 to 1998, which was dubbed "The Bat". The competition is the oldest interstate rivalry in Australia, predating even the Ashes. Melbourne Grammar has won the competition 61 times, and Sydney Grammar has won it 57 times, with 4 draws and 1 tie. In 1998 the competition was changed to include Brisbane Grammar and named the Tri-Grammar Shield. Since the inception of the Shield, Melbourne Grammar has won 10 times, Brisbane Grammar 6 times, and Sydney Grammar 5 times.

The 1st XI Cricket team tours the UK bi-annually.

APS Premierships 
Melbourne Grammar has won the following APS Premierships:

 Athletics (30) - 1905, 1908, 1909, 1918, 1920, 1921, 1922, 1923, 1924, 1925, 1927, 1929, 1930, 1931, 1932, 1933, 1934, 1937, 1938, 1939, 1941, 1943, 1948, 1950, 1952, 1956, 1960, 1962, 2010, 2016
 Cricket (37) - 1894, 1895, 1896, 1897, 1902, 1904, 1905, 1907, 1908, 1909, 1911, 1912, 1913, 1914, 1915, 1918, 1920, 1921, 1922, 1925, 1926, 1927, 1929, 1930, 1931, 1932, 1937, 1940, 1943, 1944, 1948, 1957, 1959, 1965, 1976, 2008, 2016, 2022
 Football (35) - 1893, 1901, 1905, 1906, 1911, 1912, 1919, 1920, 1921, 1923, 1926, 1928, 1929, 1931, 1934, 1935, 1936, 1938, 1940, 1941, 1944, 1946, 1948, 1949, 1950, 1951, 1952, 1957, 1964, 1970, 1976, 1982, 1995, 2008, 2013
 Hockey (6) - 1991, 1995, 2011, 2012, 2014, 2021
 Rowing (28) - 1870, 1871, 1877, 1883, 1897, 1916, 1918, 1923, 1930, 1931, 1932, 1938, 1939, 1940, 1943, 1945, 1949, 1958, 1964, 1968, 1979, 1980, 1981, 1982, 1997, 2002, 2009, 2016
 Volleyball (3) - 2006, 2008, 2016
 Water Polo (5) - 2005, 2006, 2007, 2008, 2009

Theatre

Melbourne Grammar has a strong theatre department, especially within the Senior Campus, which produces four plays each school year. In Term One, the Quad Play, most commonly a Shakespeare play, but on occasion from other notable playwrights, is performed within the school's Quadrangle, and is open to students in Years 10 to 12. In 2014, the Quad Play celebrated its 40th anniversary with Antony and Cleopatra, celebrating a notable history of productions including The Crucible, Twelfth Night and Much Ado About Nothing.

The school play, performed in August, is often the centrepiece of the year's theatrical calendar. These take place in the Memorial Hall, which was refurbished in the early 2000s. Staging and sets are constructed jointly by staff and students, often both current and former. These productions alternate between musicals and plays. Notable productions in recent history have included Tim Winton's Cloudstreet, Gilbert and Sullivan's The Pirates of Penzance, Lerner and Loewe's "My Fair Lady", Oscar Wilde's An Ideal Husband, and Leonard Bernstein's West Side Story. In 2014, Melbourne Grammar School performed Peter Shaffer's Amadeus and One Man, Two Guvnors was presented in 2019.

The final performance for the year is the Spring Production, which is open to students in Years 9 and 10. These plays take place in late Term Four, off-campus to leave the Memorial Hall free for VCE exams. These productions in recent years have provided modern updates to classic stories, including Lord of the Flies, Animal Farm and Sweeney Todd, as well as performing modern plays such as Nick Enright's Spurboard. In 2013 Eugène Ionesco's Rhinoceros was performed.

All of these plays are performed by the students of Melbourne Grammar in conjunction with students from the sister school, Melbourne Girls Grammar School, whose campus is located nearby.

Wadhurst, Melbourne Grammar's middle school, also partakes in an annual production. This is performed either on the Wadhurst Deck or in the Wadhurst Hall. These productions usually take the form of a classic children's tale such as Pinocchio or A Christmas Carol. In 2008, to celebrate the school's sesquicentenary, the play Glimpses of the Generations was performed featuring 150 years of the school's history. In 2013, the Wadhurst Production took the form of a film, featuring a Melbourne Grammar twist on Alice in Wonderland, produced by students.

Year 8 students also have the opportunity to take part in the Year 8 Project, established in 2012 with a reimagining of A Midsummer Night's Dream. Students from Melbourne Grammar and Melbourne Girls Grammar have the opportunity not only to act in a play but to take part in its development and production. The 2013 production was a surrealist modern update of Alan Ayckbourn's Ernie's Incredible Illucinations.

Crest and motto

The school motto, Ora et Labora, which may be translated from Latin to "Pray and Work", was chosen by the second headmaster, Edward Morris, in 1875. An old boy of England's Rugby School, Morris exemplified the way the principles of the English Public School system were adopted in Australia, including that education and religion should go hand in hand, as envisaged by Bishop Perry. The motto clearly reflects this.

The school crest is composed of a number of elements. The Archbishop's mitre placed on top of the crest indicates the school's connection with the Church of England; the mitre in the shield is in memory of Charles Perry, the school's founder; the open book represents either the bible or 'Knowledge like an Open Book', while its large clasps show that the book is not to be opened with ease; the Fleur de Lys (lily) is a symbol of purity; and the Southern Cross is the emblem of Australia, and is also on the Victorian and Australian flags.

Fight song 
Melbourne Grammar's fight song is "Play Together, Dark Blue Twenty", sung to the tune of "Men of Harlech". It is one of the oldest fight songs in Australia. Ambrose John Wilson, principal of the school from 1885 to 1893, wrote lyrics. The lyrics cover  the school's three main sports in the late-19th century: Australian rules football, cricket and rowing. 

The Australian rules verse is: 

The chorus between each verse is: 

The cricket verse: 

The rowing verse: 

A fourth verse with its own chorus was added in the early 20th century with imperial connotations. While it is not officially discontinued, this addition is no longer sung:

Alumni

See also
 List of schools in Victoria
 List of high schools in Victoria
 Old Melburnians Football Club

Notes
  Who's Who of boys' school rankings:  1. Scotch College, Melbourne, 2. Melbourne Grammar School, 3. Melbourne High School, 4. Geelong Grammar School, 5. Sydney Boys High School, 6. Wesley College, 7. Shore, 8. Fort Street Boys' High, 9. North Sydney Boys High School, 10. Sydney Grammar School

References

Further reading
 Challenging Traditions, Weston Bate and Helen Penrose (2002)
 Kiddle, J Beacham, (ed), Liber Melburniensis (1848-1936), Robertson & Mullens Ltd, Melbourne, 1937
 Liber Melburniensis, Centenary edition 1858–1958, revised edition 1915-1995
 Southerner, "The Story of Great Public Schools: Melbourne Grammar: Sporting Record of Famous Melburnians", The Referee, (Wednesday, 21 January 1931), p.13.

External links
 
 Encyclopedia of Melbourne article

Heritage-listed buildings in Melbourne
Associated Public Schools of Victoria
Boarding schools in Victoria (Australia)
Member schools of the Headmasters' and Headmistresses' Conference
Boys' schools in Victoria (Australia)
Educational institutions established in 1858
Anglican schools in Melbourne
Junior School Heads Association of Australia Member Schools
1858 establishments in Australia
Buildings and structures in the City of Melbourne (LGA)
 
Buildings and structures in the City of Glen Eira